Hoaden is a hamlet situated one mile (1.6 km) to the east of Elmstone, Kent, England. Within the hamlet is Hoaden Court.

External links

Villages in Kent
Dover District